Naturalizer may refer to:

in mathematics, the naturalizer of an infranatural transformation
Naturalizer, a shoe brand of Caleres